Loy Stephen Vaught (born February 27, 1968) is an American former professional basketball player who spent ten seasons in the National Basketball Association (NBA), primarily with the Los Angeles Clippers.

Vaught played at East Kentwood High School in Kentwood, Michigan, a suburb of Grand Rapids, and helped lead the University of Michigan Wolverines to the 1989 NCAA Men's Division I Basketball Championship.

Vaught was drafted in 1990 by the Los Angeles Clippers. For a short period in the mid-1990s, Vaught was one of the most consistent forwards in the league, averaging 16.2 points and approximately 10 rebounds per game while missing only four games between 1994 and 1997. On April 22, 1994, in a 127-122 loss to the Suns, Vaught scored 29 points and grabbed 11 rebounds. On February 9, 1995, he scored a career-best 33 points along grabbing 13 rebounds in a 122-107 win over the defending champion Houston Rockets. On December 16, 1996, he scored 17 points and grabbed 21 rebounds in a 122-121 victory over the Suns. That same season, Vaught led an undermanned Clippers team to the playoffs as an 8 seed, where they were swept by NBA MVP Karl Malone and the Utah Jazz in the first round.

Injuries sustained in 1997 hampered his career, and after that his play sharply decreased in quality and he never played more than 51 games in a season again.

Vaught closed out his career with a series of stints with the Detroit Pistons, Dallas Mavericks, and Washington Wizards. He had a well earned reputation as an outstanding rebounder in his prime (especially on the defensive end of the court). He finished twice among the top ten overall and top ten defensive rebounders in the league.

Loy Vaught lives in Los Angeles. He has two daughters, Lexi and Maya.

References

External links

"Loy Vaught: A Personal Remembrance" by Gary Adornato (November 8, 2001)
Loy Vaught Statistics @ Basketball-Reference.com
Loy Vaught Statistics @ BasketballReference.com
University of Michigan Basketball Statistical Archive

1968 births
Living people
African-American basketball players
Basketball players from Grand Rapids, Michigan
Dallas Mavericks players
Detroit Pistons players
Los Angeles Clippers draft picks
Los Angeles Clippers players
Michigan Wolverines men's basketball players
Power forwards (basketball)
Washington Wizards players
American men's basketball players
21st-century African-American people
20th-century African-American sportspeople